Chakri may refer to:

People
 Chakri (composer) (1974–2014), Tollywood music director
 Chakri Toleti, Indian American screenwriter, director, actor, and visual effects coordinator

Other uses
 Chakri (noble title), a historical Thai noble title for the king's chief minister
 Chakri dynasty, the royal house of Thailand
 The Gujarati name for murukku, an Indian snack
 Chakri or charkha, Indian name for the spinning wheel used for making khadi cloth
 A small chakram, a throwing weapon
 Chakri or Chakri, a village in Jhelum, Pakistan
 Chakri is an alternative name for the Indian snack Chakli